Foundations and Trends in Theoretical Computer Science is a peer-reviewed scientific journal that publishes long survey and tutorial articles in the field of theoretical computer science. It was established in 2005 and is published by Now Publishers. The founding editor-in-chief is Madhu Sudan (Microsoft Research).

Abstracting and indexing 
The journal is abstracted and indexed in:
 Inspec
 EI-Compendex
 Scopus
 CSA databases
 ACM Digital Library

External links 
 

Computer science journals
Now Publishers academic journals
Publications established in 2004
Quarterly journals
English-language journals